Andrew John Edmondson   (born 24 June 1990) is an Australian wheelchair rugby player. He won a gold medal at the 2016 Rio Paralympics as a member of the Australian Steelers. He has been selected for 2020 Summer Paralympics, his second Games.

Personal
Edmondson was born on 24 June 1990. His friends call him "Edmo". At the age of 13, he broke his neck whilst surfing at Coogee Beach. At the time, he had received a scholarship to play rugby at Scots College in Sydney. He has a  Bachelor of Sports Business from the Australian College of Physical Education. In 2021, he lives in Port Macquarie, New South Wales and is able to train with Ryley Batt. He has business role working for Melrose Wheelchairs and is a part of a public speaking programme through the Australian Institute of Sport in regards to mental health.

Wheelchair rugby
As part of his rehabilitation, he watched a video on wheelchair rugby whilst at the Prince of Wales Hospital and became interested in the sport. In 2004, he attended an Australian Paralympic Committee Come and Try Day.  He made his debut for the national team  the Australian Steelers in 2014. As of 2016, he has been a member of the NSW Gladiators for 10 years and captained the team for the last two years. In 2015, he played in the United States wheelchair rugby competition.

He was a member of the team that retained its gold medal at the 2016 Rio Paralympics after defeating the United States 59–58 in the final. He was awarded the Order of Australia Medal in 2017.

At the 2018 IWRF World Championship in Sydney, Australia, he was a member of the Australian team that won the silver medal after being defeated by Japan 61–62 in the gold medal game.

Edmondson his won first world championship gold medal at the 2022 IWRF World Championship in Vejle, Denmark, when Australia defeated the United States .

References

External links
 
International Paralympic Committee
 Andrew Edmondson's Story - Youtube

Paralympic wheelchair rugby players of Australia
Wheelchair rugby players at the 2016 Summer Paralympics
Wheelchair rugby players at the 2020 Summer Paralympics
1990 births
Living people
People educated at Scots College (Sydney)
Medalists at the 2016 Summer Paralympics
Paralympic gold medalists for Australia
Recipients of the Medal of the Order of Australia
Paralympic medalists in wheelchair rugby